Lyubavichi (Lyubavitsh) is a rural locality (a village) in Rudnyansky District of Smolensk Oblast, Russia.

History
The village existed in what was the Polish–Lithuanian Commonwealth since at least 1654. In 1784, it was mentioned as a small town, then a possession of the Polish princely family the Lubomirski. After the partitions of the Polish–Lithuanian Commonwealth, the village was annexed by the Russian Empire. During the French invasion of Russia in 1812, the village was occupied by Napoleonic troops for two weeks.

During the reign of the Russian Empire, the village was in Orshansky Uyezd of Mogilev Governorate. In 1857, it had a population of 2,500. Another source from approximately 1880 reports a total of 1,516 inhabitants (978 Jews) with 313 houses, two Russian Orthodox churches, and two Jewish synagogues. 

In the late 19th and early 20th centuries, Lyubavichi was the largest market within the Mogilev Governorate, with annual sales of more than 1.5 million rubles.

Jewish community
The Jewish population of Lyubavichi was 1,164 in 1847 and 1,660 in 1897. The village's economy declined after the 1917 Russian Revolution and religious Jews were persecuted by the Yevsektsiya. The Jewish population was 967 in 1926, half of the total population. During the German invasion of Russia, the German military entered Lyubavichi in August 1941, established a ghetto, and massacred the 483 remaining Jews on November 4, 1941.

Chabad-Lubavitch dynasty
The village lends its name to the Chabad-Lubavitch branch of Hasidic Judaism, where its leadership established a court and was the seat of four generations of Chabad Rebbes between 1813 and 1915.  

The second Chabad Rebbe, Dovber Schneuri (1773–1827), moved from Lyady to Lyubavichi in 1813. The third Rebbe of Chabad, Menachem Mendel Schneersohn (1789–1866), and the fourth Rebbe, Shmuel Schneersohn (1834–1882) are buried in Lyubavichi. 

The fifth Rebbe, Sholom Dovber Schneersohn (1860–1920), established the Yeshivah Tomchei Temimim Lubavitch in the village in the summer of 1897. In the fall of 1915, the rebbe evacuated his Hassidic court to Rostov, Russia with the onset of World War I. The central yeshivah was disbanded in 1917, and its students went into exile before its reestablishment by the Rebbe in Rostov.

The Chabad movement opened an information center in the village in 2008 called Hatzer Raboteinu Nesieinu Belubavitch. The center is in the former Jewish area of the village, and close to the graves of the two Rebbes. The European Conference of Shluchim brought 500 Chabad rabbis to the village in August 2016 to visit the graves and tour the village.

Gallery

Climate
Lyubavichi has a warm-summer humid continental climate (Dfb in the Köppen climate classification).

<div style="width:70%;">

References

External links
History of Chabad in the village of Lubavitch  
JewishGen Locality Page: Lyubavichi, Russia

Sources

Chabad communities
Chabad in Europe
Hasidic Judaism in Russia
Rural localities in Smolensk Oblast
Orshansky Uyezd
Historic Jewish communities in Europe
Holocaust locations in Russia
Jewish communities destroyed in the Holocaust